Alfred George Jamison (November 5, 1937 – May 1, 2021) was an American professional football player who was an offensive lineman in the American Football League (AFL) in the 1960s. Nicknamed "Al the Assassin" during his playing days for his chippy play up to and sometimes after the whistle, Jamison was a star offensive tackle for the Houston Oilers.  

Jamison played college football for the Colgate Raiders before playing pro ball for the Oilers. He was an All-AFL tackle in 1961 and an American Football League Eastern Division All-Star in 1962. He played in the first three AFL Championship games, winning the title in 1960 and 1961.

He died on May 1, 2021, in Columbus, Texas, at age 83.

See also
Other American Football League players

References

1937 births
2021 deaths
American Football League All-Star players
American Football League All-League players
American Football League announcers
American Football League players
American football offensive linemen
Colgate Raiders football players
Houston Oilers announcers
Houston Oilers players
Players of American football from Ohio
Sportspeople from Toledo, Ohio